The Time Machine (also marketed as H. G. Wells' The Time Machine) is a 1960 American period post-apocalyptic science fiction film based on the 1895 novella of the same name by H. G. Wells. It was produced and directed by George Pal, and stars Rod Taylor, Yvette Mimieux, and Alan Young. The story is set in Victorian England and follows an inventor who constructs a machine that enables him to travel into the distant future. Once there, he discovers that mankind's descendants have divided into two species, the passive, childlike, and vegetarian Eloi and the underground-dwelling Morlocks, who feed on the Eloi.

The film was originally released on August 17, 1960, and was distributed by Metro-Goldwyn-Mayer. It received the Academy Award for Best Special Effects for its time-lapse photographic effects, which show the world changing rapidly as the time traveler journeys into the future.

Plot

On January 5, 1900, four friends arrive for a dinner at the London home of their inventor friend George. He is absent, then suddenly appears, bedraggled and exhausted. He recounts what happened to him.

At the group's earlier dinner on New Year's Eve, George stated that time is the 4th Dimension. He shows David Filby, Dr. Philip Hillyer, Anthony Bridewell, and Walter Kemp a scale model time machine. When a tiny lever on it is pressed, the device quickly disappears. George says it went forward in time, but his friends are skeptical. The group leaves George's house, Filby reluctantly, as he senses George is not himself. Thereafter, George retires to his private laboratory that holds a full-size time machine.

George travels forward in time, first in small increments, and then to 1917. He meets Filby's son, James, who says Filby died in a war. George returns to the time machine and stops in 1940 during the Blitz, finding himself in the midst of "a new war". A disillusioned George then travels to 1966. People are rushing to fallout shelters as air raid sirens are blaring. An elderly James Filby urges George to take cover. George barely makes it back to his time machine as an "atomic satellite" detonates, causing a local volcanic eruption. The approaching lava rises, cools, and hardens, trapping George as he travels far into the future. Eventually the lava wears away, revealing a lush, unspoiled landscape.

George stops at October 12, 802,701, near the base of a sphinx. He encounters young men and women wearing simple clothing gathered at a stream. One woman, carried off by the current, screams for help. When her indifferent companions do nothing, George rescues her. The girl is Weena and her people are the Eloi; they do not operate machines, work, or read, and know little of their history. Their food is always provided for them. One young male shows George a library, but the books crumble to dust when touched. Outraged, he decides to leave, but his machine has been dragged into the closed sphinx. Weena, who stays with him, says that Morlocks are responsible, noting they only come out at night. A hideous-looking Morlock jumps out and tries to drag Weena away, but is warded off by George's fire torch.

The next day, Weena shows George domed structures dotting the landscape, air shafts that lead down to the Morlocks' caverns. Weena also shows George an ancient museum where "talking rings" tell of long-ago war between east and west that lasted 326 years and contaminated the atmosphere. Another ring describes humanity's struggle for survival; many lived underground, while some eventually returned to the surface. George realizes this was the beginning of the speciation that resulted in the Morlocks and Eloi. He starts to climb down a shaft, but stops when sirens emerge and blare from the sphinx. The Eloi go into a trance-like state and head for the opened doors at the sphinx's base. The sirens stop and the doors close, trapping Weena and others inside, while those outside merely walk away.

George enters the caverns through the air shafts. He discovers that the Morlocks raise the Eloi as food. He finds Weena and fights off the creatures, finally inspiring the Eloi to defend themselves. George sets fires and urges the Eloi to climb to the surface. He directs them to drop tree branches down the shafts. The resulting fires cause the caverns to burn, then collapse.

The next morning, the sphinx's doors are open. George's time machine is inside. Upon his entering, the doors close, and George is attacked by Morlocks. He escapes in his machine and returns to 1900.

After George recounts his story, his friends remain skeptical. He produces a flower Weena gave him, and Filby, an amateur botanist, identifies it as an unknown species. George bids his guests good evening. Filby returns shortly thereafter to find George and his time machine gone. His housekeeper, Mrs. Watchett, notes that nothing is missing except three books that she is unable to identify. When Mrs. Watchett wonders if George will ever return, Filby knowingly remarks that "he has all the time in the world".

Cast
 Rod Taylor as H. George Wells
 Alan Young as David Filby/James Filby
 Yvette Mimieux as Weena
 Sebastian Cabot as Dr. Philip Hillyer
 Tom Helmore as Anthony Bridewell
 Whit Bissell as Walter Kemp
 Doris Lloyd as Mrs. Watchett
 Paul Frees as voice of the Rings (uncredited)

Production
George Pal was already known for his pioneering work with stop-motion animation, having been nominated almost yearly for an Oscar during the 1940s. Unable to sell Hollywood on the concept of the film, he found MGM's British studio (where he had filmed Tom Thumb) open to his proposal.

The name of the film's main character (alluded to in dialogue only as "George") connects him both with George Pal and with the story's original science fiction writer H. G. (George) Wells. The name "H. George Wells" can be seen on a brass plaque on the time machine.

Pal originally considered casting a middle-aged British actor like David Niven or James Mason as George. He later changed his mind and selected the younger Australian actor Rod Taylor to give the character a more athletic, idealistic dimension. It was Taylor's first lead role in a feature film.

The time machine prop was designed by MGM art director Bill Ferrari and built by Wah Chang. Recognized today as an iconic film property, Ferrari's machine suggested a sled made up of a large clockwork rotating disk. The disk rotated at various speeds to indicate movement through time, evoking both a spinning clock and a solar disk. In a meta-concept touch, a brass plate on the time machine's instrument display panel identifies its inventor as "H. George Wells", though the Time Traveler is identified only as "George" in dialogue. In Wells' original story, the protagonist is referred to only as the "Time Traveler".

The look of the Morlocks was designed by Wah Chang.

With a budget of under $1 million, the film could not be shot on location in London. Live-action scenes were filmed from May 25 to June 30, 1959, in Culver City, California, with the backgrounds often filled in by virtue of matte paintings & models. Some of the costumes and set were re-used from Forbidden Planet (1956) such as the Civil Defence air raid officer uniform which was the C-57-D crew uniform and the large acrylic sphere in the talking rings room, a prop from the C-57-D's control bridge.

Home media releases
Released multiple times on Beta and VHS video cassette, Capacitance Electronic Disc (CED), and both letterboxed and open matte LaserDisc, the film was released on DVD in October 2000 and on Blu-ray Disc in July 2014 from Warner Home Video.

Soundtrack
An original film score CD was released in 1987 produced by Arnold Leibovit, the original soundtrack recording was composed and conducted by Russell Garcia himself. Released by GNP Crescendo. The track listing is as follows:

Critical reception
The Time Machine received generally mixed reviews upon release. Bosley Crowther of The New York Times wrote a mixed review, praising the "familiar polish and burnish" of the production values but finding that "the drama, for all its invention, is creaky and a bit passé. (Apparently there has still been no contact with other planets in 800,000 A.D.) And the mood, while delicately wistful, is not so flippant or droll as it might be in a fiction as fanciful and flighty as this one naturally is". A generally positive review in Variety praised the special effects as "fascinating" and wrote that "Rod Taylor definitely establishes himself as one of the premium young talents on today's screen", but faulted the pacing of the film, finding that "things slow down to a walk" once the protagonist arrives in the far distant future. Harrison's Reports called the film "an excellent science-fiction melodrama ... jammed full of suspense, action and out-of-this-world special effects", although the review lamented a lack of comic relief. Whitney Balliett of The New Yorker wrote in a negative review that the film "converts this good simple-minded material into bad simple-minded material", by including such Hollywood touches as a love interest. He was also unimpressed by the production values, writing that the model sets "don't touch the lowest-price Lionel train". Richard L. Coe of The Washington Post wrote that with the exception of the "gooey" love interest, "the tale is an engrossing one, boasting adroit camera tricks by Paul C. Vogel and an exceptionally easy, likable performance of the Time Traveler by Taylor. The youngsters will like this, and their elders will be kept wide awake". The Monthly Film Bulletin wrote that the film was "at its best in the scenes where George explores his new surroundings at each time stop", but found the acting "inadequate: Rod Taylor lacks both intellect and period sense, belonging more to an American science fiction world, and Weena is just a doll. Nevertheless, Pal's visual flair and genuine feeling for his fantasy world help to maintain an entertaining surface for most of the time".
 
On review aggregator Rotten Tomatoes, the film holds a score of 76% based on 38 reviews, with the consensus, "Its campy flourishes tend to subdue its dramatic stakes, but The Time Machine brings H.G. Wells' story to life with plenty of sci-fi charm and a colorful sense of visual design."

Box office
According to MGM records, the film earned $1,610,000 in the United States and Canada and $1 million elsewhere, turning a profit of $245,000.

The film had admissions of 363,915 in France. Kine Weekly called it a "money maker" at the British box office in 1960.

Awards and honors
Gene Warren and Tim Baar won the 1961 Academy Award for Best Effects, Special Effects.

The film was nominated for the 1961 Hugo Award for Best Dramatic Presentation.

Comic book adaptation
 Dell Four Color #1085 (March 1960)

1993 documentary
In 1993, a combination sequel-documentary short, Time Machine: The Journey Back, directed by Clyde Lucas, was produced. In its third section, Michael J. Fox talks about his experience with the DeLorean sports car time machine from Back to the Future. In the short's final section, written by screenwriter David Duncan, Rod Taylor, Alan Young, and Whit Bissell reprise their roles from the original 1960 film.

See also

 Time After Time, a 1979 science-fiction film in which H. G. Wells (played by Malcolm McDowell) travels to modern-day San Francisco in his time machine in pursuit of Jack the Ripper.
 The Time Machine, a 2002 remake directed by Simon Wells and an uncredited Gore Verbinski, and starring Guy Pearce in the Taylor role.
 The Quantum Leap episode "Future Boy", which takes place on October 6, 1957, features a character who builds a time machine very similar to that used in Pal's film.
 In "The Nerdvana Annihilation", the 14th episode from the 1st season of The Big Bang Theory, the characters purchase for $800 a scale model of the film's time machine at an online auction site, only to discover when it arrives that it is not a scale model but a full-size, operating prop reproduction; Morlocks later haunt Sheldon's dreams of time-traveling to the far future.
 "Journey to the Bottom of the Crash Pit", the 21st episode from the 5th season of Regular Show, in which Mordecai, Rigby, Muscle Man, and Hi-Five Ghost have to venture into the bottom of the crash pit to find their video camera before their boss Benson notices it is gone; the Carlocks they meet are based on the Morlocks from the H. G. Wells novel and their appearance is based on the Morlocks seen in Pal's film.

References

Bibliography
 Hickman, Gail Morgan. The Films of George Pal. South Brunswick, New Jersey:  A. S. Barnes and Company, Inc., 1977. .
 Warren, Bill. Keep Watching the Skies: American Science Fiction Films of the Fifties, 21st Century Edition. Jefferson, North Carolina: McFarland & Company, 2009 (First Edition 1982). .

External links

 
 
 
 
 
 Colemanzone.com: A tribute to the classic 1960 MGM movie The Time Machine
  The Time Machine - synopsis of film scenes
 Script (scifimoviepage.com)
 Cinematographic analysis of The Time Machine
 

1960 films
1960s American films
1960s English-language films
1960s science fiction adventure films
American science fantasy films
American science fiction adventure films
apocalyptic films
cultural depictions of H. G. Wells
films about hypnosis
films about time travel
films adapted into comics
films based on science fiction novels
films based on works by H. G. Wells
films directed by George Pal
films produced by George Pal
films set around New Year
films set in 1899
films set in 1900
films set in 1917
films set in 1940
films set in 1966
films set in England
films set in London
films set in the 1800s
films set in the 1900s
films set in the future
films set in the Victorian era
films that won the Best Visual Effects Academy Award
films using stop-motion animation
films with screenplays by David Duncan (writer)
Metro-Goldwyn-Mayer films
The Time Machine